John Loudwell Hand (June 14, 1902 – July 7, 1967) was a Canadian rower who competed in the 1928 Summer Olympics.

Born in Toronto, he won the bronze medal as member of the Canadian boat in the eights competition in 1928.

External links

 profile

1902 births
1967 deaths
Rowers from Toronto
Canadian male rowers
Olympic bronze medalists for Canada
Olympic rowers of Canada
Rowers at the 1928 Summer Olympics
Olympic medalists in rowing
Medalists at the 1928 Summer Olympics
20th-century Canadian people